Castle Naghten is a motte and National Monument located in County Roscommon, Ireland.

Location

History 
Motte-and-bailey castles were a primitive type of castle built after the Norman invasion, a mound of earth topped by a wooden palisade and tower.

The motte at Castle Naghten was constructed to control the route from Athlone to Rindown, a narrow and arduous way passing through bogland.

References

National Monuments in County Roscommon
Archaeological sites in County Roscommon